Astegopteryx minuta is an aphid in the superfamily Aphidoidea in the order Hemiptera. It is a true bug and sucks sap from plants.

References 

 http://animaldiversity.org/accounts/Astegopteryx_minuta/classification/
 http://www.nbair.res.in/Aphids/Astegopteryx-minuta.php
 http://aphid.speciesfile.org/Common/basic/Taxa.aspx?TaxonNameID=1162672
 http://www.wildreach.com/reptile/animals/aphids.php

Hormaphidinae
Agricultural pest insects
Insects described in 1917